Opisthotropis rugosa, the Sumatran stream snake, is a species of natricine snake found on Sumatra in Indonesia.

References

Opisthotropis
Reptiles described in 1890
Reptiles of Indonesia
Taxa named by Theodorus Willem van Lidth de Jeude